The Great Bay National Estuarine Research Reserve encompasses a diversity of land and water areas around Great Bay, an estuary in southeastern New Hampshire.

Great Bay has a rich cultural history and was the first major commercial waterway developed by the early settlers.

The National Estuarine Research Reserve System (NERRS) is a nationwide network of state-owned and -managed coastal protected areas. These are designated and supported by the National Oceanic and Atmospheric Administration (NOAA) under the United States Department of Commerce.

The New Hampshire Fish and Game Department under the Marine Fisheries Division manages the Great Bay NERR. Designated in 1989, the reserve's primary purpose is to promote the wise use and management of the Great Bay estuary.

Visiting
The Great Bay Discovery Center, located in Greenland, New Hampshire, features interpretive exhibits about the estuary's natural history, salt marsh farming, salmon migration, plankton, tides and research.

Other facilities on the grounds include the Hugh Gregg Coastal Conservation Center, used for education programs and available for rental, a universally accessible trail and boardwalk, a 19th-century gundalow replica, a replica Native American camp and gardens.

References

Great Bay National Estuarine Research Reserve - National Estuarine Research Reserve System

External links
 Great Bay National Estuarine Research Reserve - official site
 Great Bay Resource Protection Partnership

Protected areas of New Hampshire
National Estuarine Research Reserves of the United States
Nature centers in New Hampshire
Protected areas of Rockingham County, New Hampshire
Protected areas of Strafford County, New Hampshire